The Daniel Crosby House is a historic house located in the Osterville village of Barnstable, Massachusetts.

Description and history 
Built c. 1790, it is a -story "half Cape" (three bays wide), with a side entry and chimney. This well-preserved house was owned by Daniel Crosby, the progenitor of the locally prominent Crosby family, and Reverend Edward Bourne Hinckley, the community's first librarian. It was also home to the local historical society for a time.

The house was listed on the National Register of Historic Places on September 18, 1987.

See also
National Register of Historic Places listings in Barnstable County, Massachusetts

References

Houses in Barnstable, Massachusetts
National Register of Historic Places in Barnstable, Massachusetts
Houses on the National Register of Historic Places in Barnstable County, Massachusetts